Roman Kapitanenko (born January 21, 1981) is a Ukrainian amateur boxer who won the bronze medal at the European Championships 2008. He benefitted from Vyacheslav Glazkov's decision to turn pro. He beat Vladimir Prusa and Yousef Abdelghani before losing his semifinal 4:6 to Kubrat Pulev.

At the 2009 World Amateur Boxing Championships he defeated Erislandy Savon and Zhang Zhilei, but lost the final to Roberto Cammarelle.

He won the bronze medal at the 2010 European Amateur Boxing Championships at Moscow, Russia after he lost to Viktor Zuyev from Belarus in the Semifinals.

References
Euro 2008
Profile

Living people
Heavyweight boxers
1981 births
People from Feodosia
Ukrainian male boxers
AIBA World Boxing Championships medalists
21st-century Ukrainian people